There are over 20,000 Grade II* listed buildings in England. This page is a list of these buildings in the district of Stafford in Staffordshire.

Stafford

|}

Notes

External links

 
Lists of Grade II* listed buildings in Staffordshire
Borough of Stafford